Do Qaidi is a 1989 Hindi-language action thriller film directed by Ajay Kashyap starring Govinda, Sanjay Dutt, Farah and Neelam Kothari.

Plot

Manu (Sanjay Dutt) and Kanu (Govinda) are two thieves. They work for criminal K.K. (Amrish Puri). But, Bichoo (Gulshan Grover) who is K.K.'s son, dislikes them because of past disputes. Bichoo out of enmity gets them arrested. However they escape while going to court. It is then revealed that they are responsible for killing a Police Inspector named Amar Sinha (Suresh Oberoi), and that the police have issued shoot-at-sight orders for both of them. The question remains, why would two small thieves kill a Police Officer. Is this a conspiracy against them or truth.

Cast

Sanjay Dutt as  Manu
Govinda as  Kanu
Farah as Meenu (Neelu's Sister) 
Neelam Kothari as  Neelu (Meenu's Sister) 
Amrish Puri as  K.K.
Gulshan Grover as  Bichoo
Ranjeeta Kaur as  Mrs. Amar Sinha
Suresh Oberoi as  Inspector Amar Sinha
Jalal Agha
Vikas Anand as  Inspector Naik
Bharat Bhushan
Birbal
Baby Guddu as Baby Rani
Kamal Kapoor as  Police Commissioner
Shubha Khote as  Woman with necklace
Guddi Maruti 
Ghanshyam Rohera as Havaldar Syed Ali
Gita Siddharth

Tracks

  Allah Allah Yeh Kaisa Gazab [05:30]: Shabbir Kumar, Kavita Krishnamurthy 
  Aa Rab Se Dua Mange [05:52]: Mohammad Aziz, Suresh Wadkar, Anuradha Paudwal, Kavita Krishnamurthy
  Hanste Jana Tum [04:04]: Kishore Kumar 
  Hum Rahen Na Rahen [02:00]: Sadhana Sargam, Sonali Vajpayee 
  Parody Song (Do Qaidi) [07:10]: Amit Kumar, Mohammad Aziz, Laxmikant–Pyarelal 
  Yeh Chali Woh Chali [06:24]: Laxmikant–Pyarelal, Kavita Krishnamurthy

References

External links 
 

1980s Hindi-language films
1989 films
Films scored by Laxmikant–Pyarelal
Films directed by Ajay Kashyap